Pyramidobela quinquecristata is a moth in the family Oecophoridae. It is found in the mountains around the margins of the Great Basin in North America.

The ground color of the forewings is dark brown, longitudinally streaked with blackish and ochreous, varying in density and ill-defined except on the veins in the terminal area. The ground color of the hindwings is pale gray-brown, but slightly darker toward the apex. Adults are on wing in June (in British Columbia) and from August to early September (in California).

The larvae have been recorded feeding on Penstemon species, including Penstemon confertus and Penstemon deustus.

References

Moths described in 1921
Oecophoridae